Queen Louise's Children's Hospital was a hospital in Copenhagen, Denmark from 1879 to 1971. It was named for and supported by Louise of Hesse-Kassel.

References

Defunct hospitals in Copenhagen
Hospitals established in 1879
1879 establishments in Denmark
Hospitals disestablished in 1971
1971 disestablishments in Denmark